Mario Pardo Villagómez (born February 14, 1984) is a Mexican luchador, best known under the ring name Oficial AK-47. As Oficial AK-47 he is part of a group called Los Oficiales that has worked for International Wrestling Revolution Group (IWRG) since 2007. The team held the record for the longest reigning Distrito Federal Trios Champions and are the most successful holders of the IWRG Intercontinental Trios Championship, holding it longer than any other trios team and having defended it more times than any previous champions have. AK-47 is also a former one-time IWRG Intercontinental Middleweight Champion. He previously worked as the enmascarado characters Sureño de la Muerte and Black Stone. He is named after the AK-47 assault rifle. Wrestling most his career under a mask, Pardo's true identity was revealed on December 22, 2011, when he lost his mask in a match against Trauma I.

Professional wrestling career
Pardo made his debut in 2003, working as an enmascarado called "Sureño de la Muerte" (Spanish for "Southern Death"). Later on he was recast as "Black Stone", working on the undercard of various International Wrestling Revolution Group (IWRG) shows.

Los Oficiales

In early 2007 IWRG officials decided to form a new version of the group Los Oficiales ("The Officials"), a masked trios group that all had a "Police officer" ring character. The three masked men, Oficial 911, Oficial AK-47, and Oficial Fierro were unveiled at a Lucha Libre festival in May 2007. It was later revealed that Black Stone had not left IWRG as suspected, but in fact was the wrestler working as Oficial Ak-47. On July 7, 2007, they defeated the Japanese trio of Kai, Sasaki and Yamato to win the Distrito Federal Trios Championship, a title that had been relatively inactive up for at least a year before Los Oficiales won the belts.

Los Oficiales went on to defend the Trios title on a regular basis, giving credibility to both the Trios championship and to Los Oficiales as a group. On September 28, 2008, Los Oficiales became double champions as they defeated Cyborg, Kraneo, Xibalva (who had all been members of previous incarnations of Los Oficiales) to win the IWRG Intercontinental Trios Championship. Their success in 2008 led to several Mexican publications naming Los Oficiales as the best Trio, or runner-up for best Trios team for 2008. Los Oficiales run as double Trio champions ended on December 7, 2008, when Los Terrible Cerebros (Black Terry, Dr. Cerebro and Cerebro Negro). Los Oficiales continued to defend the IWRG Trios title through 2009 and into 2010, and by April 21, 2010, had made at least nine successful defenses of the title, more than any previous title holder. Their success has also seen them named the best version of Los Oficiales.
Oficial AK-47 has also achieved individual success, including winning a number of Lucha de Apuesta or bet matches. On December 21, 2008, AK-47 and Arlequin were the last two wrestlers in a 10-man Steel Cage match and thus were forced to wrestled for their mask (AK-47) or hair (Arlequin). In the end AK-47 pinned Arlequin and watched as his opponent was shaved bald after the match per Lucha Libre traditions. AK-47 also won IWRG's annual Castillo del Terror ("Castle of Terror") match in 2009, unmasking Yack. On March 3, 2011, Los Oficiales lost the IWRG Intercontinental Trios Championship to Joe Líder, Silver King and Último Gladiador, ending their reign at 886 days. On December 22, Oficial AK-47 teamed with Trauma I to face Oficial 911 and Trauma II in a Relevos Suicidas match and after losing the match, AK-47 and Trauma I were forced to face each other in a Mask vs. Mask match. Originally AK-47 won the match with a Martinete, but the referee reversed the decision and disqualified him, after finding out about the illegal move, forcing AK-47 to unmask himself. Upon unmasking, AK-47 revealed that his real name was Mario Pardo Villagómez and that he was a 27-year-old, seven-year veteran originally from the city of Casas Grandes, Chihuahua. On March 15, 2012, AK-47 also lost his hair in another Lucha de Apuestas, after interfering in a steel cage match between Oficial 911 and Oficial Factor, a member of rival group Los Oficiales Elite, ending up being left in the cage, when the other Oficiales escaped. On May 6, Oficial AK-47 defeated Veneno in the finals of a tournament to become the first IWRG Intercontinental Middleweight Champion in four years.  He lost the title to El Ángel on October 7, 2012. On February 7, 2013, Los Oficiales lost the Distrito Federal Trios Championship to El Hijo de Pirata Morgan, Pirata Morgan and Pirata Morgan, Jr. On June 15, 2014, AK-47 and 911 defeated Apolo Estrada, Jr. and El Hijo del Diablo to win the IWRG Intercontinental Tag Team Championship.

Championships and accomplishments
Alianza Universal de Lucha Libre
AULL Tag Team Championship (1 time, current) – with Oficial 911
International Wrestling Revolution Group
IWRG Intercontinental Middleweight Championship (1 time)
IWRG Intercontinental Tag Team Championship (2 times) – with Oficial 911
IWRG Intercontinental Trios Championship (1 time) – with Oficial 911 and Oficial Fierro
Mexico State Wrestling and Boxing Commission
Distrito Federal Trios Championship (2 times) – with Oficial 911 and Oficial Fierro

Lucha de Apuesta record

Footnotes

References

1984 births
Living people
Masked wrestlers
Mexican male professional wrestlers
Professional wrestlers from Chihuahua (state)
People from Casas Grandes Municipality